Winterbourne (also known as the John Ferguson House) is a historic home in Orange Park, Florida. It is located at 2104 Winterbourne West, Orange Park, Fl 32073 on the St. Johns River. On February 23, 1996, it was added to the U.S. National Register of Historic Places.

References

External links
 
 Clay County listings at National Register of Historic Places
 Winterbourne on the St. John's at Florida's Office of Cultural and Historical Programs

National Register of Historic Places in Clay County, Florida
Houses on the National Register of Historic Places in Florida
Houses in Clay County, Florida